Sabera caesina, the white-clubbed swift or black and white swift, is a butterfly of the family Hesperiidae. It is found in Australia in Queensland, Papua New Guinea, and in Indonesia in the Aru Islands and Papua.

The wingspan is about 30 mm.

The larvae of subspecies S. c. albifascia feed on Archontophoenix alexandrae, Normanbya normanbyi and Calamus caryotoides. During the day, it lives in a shelter made from a cut and folded leaf of the host plant. S. c. barina probably feeds on Licula or Calamus species.

Subspecies
Sabera caesina caesina
Sabera caesina albifascia (Miskin, 1889) - black and white swift (northern Gulf and north-eastern coast of Queensland)
Sabera caesina barina Fruhstorfer, 1910 (Papua New Guinea)

External links
The Life History of Sabera fuliginosa fuliginosa (Miskin) (Lepidoptera: Hesperiidae) and additional hostplants for the other members of the genus in Northern Queensland
Australian Insects
Australian Faunal Directory

Taractrocerini
Butterflies described in 1886